= Oghenekevwe =

Given name

- Gender: Unisex

Origin
- Language: Urhobo
- Origin: Nigerian
- Meaning: God has given

Oghenekevwe is an Urhobo given name from southern Nigeria. Meaning “God has given,” “God gave this,” or “Gift from God.”
